Daddala is a genus of moths in the family Erebidae erected by Francis Walker in 1865. The genus is exclusively Indo-Australian, extending from the Indian Subregion to New Guinea.

Selected species
Daddala achaeoides Walker, 1865
Daddala anguilinea Bethune-Baker, 1906
Daddala avola Bethune-Baker, 1906
Daddala berioi Kobes, 1985
Daddala brevicauda (Wileman & South, 1921)
Daddala columba Kobes, 1985
Daddala lucia Kobes, 1985
Daddala lucilla (Butler, 1881)
Daddala lucillina Kobes, 1985
Daddala microdesma (A. E. Prout, 1928)
Daddala quadrisignata Walker, 1865
Daddala renisigna Moore, 1883
Daddala sublineata (Walker, 1865)

References

Sypnini
Moth genera